GameDaily (GD) was a video game journalism website based in the United States.

It was launched in 1995 by entrepreneur Mark Friedler under the name Gigex and focused on free game demo downloads. The site changed its business model from a flat fee per download CDN distributed service network to an advertising-based games content portal, content syndication and vertical ad network. The site also operated business news service GameDaily Biz.

The network grew to the number one position in ComScore's Games/Gaming Information category in March 2005 and was acquired by AOL on August 16, 2006. The site offered articles on different video game topics, with many game rankings lists.

In 2011, the GameDaily brand was retired. Its staff and content were merged with Joystiq, another video game website owned by AOL. In 2018, Greenlit Content relaunched GameDaily as GameDaily.biz.

References

External links

American journalism
Video game websites